Carabus cancellatus is a ground beetle common in Central- and Northern Europe and Siberia. It has also been introduced into North America.

Subspecies
It has nine subspecies:
Carabus cancellatus alessiensis Apfelbeck 1901
Carabus cancellatus cancellatus Illiger, 1798
Carabus cancellatus carinatus Charpentier, 1825
Carabus cancellatus corpulentus Kraatz, 1880
Carabus cancellatus emarginatus Duftschmid, 1812
Carabus cancellatus excisus Dejean, 1826
Carabus cancellatus graniger Palliardi, 1825
Carabus cancellatus tibiscinus Csiki, 1906
Carabus cancellatus tuberculatus Dejean, 1826

External links

Picture gallery
Carabus cancellatus on You Tube

Beetles described in 1798
Beetles of Asia
Beetles of Europe
cancellatus